Phantom of the Night is the sixth studio album by Dutch Progressive rock band Kayak. "Ruthless Queen" was released as a single, becoming the band's biggest hit, nearing the top of the charts in the Netherlands.

In the United States, the LP (with a different sleeve design) was also released as a picture disc, in a limited edition of 3,000 copies.

The album was Kayak's biggest commercial success, but it was only in August 2010 that it was released on CD in its own right. Until that date, the album was only available as part of a boxed set with two other Kayak albums.

Track listing

Side 1
 "Keep the Change" – 3:38 (T. Scherpenzeel)
 "Winning Ways" – 3:35 (I. Linders/T. Scherpenzeel)
 "Daphne (Laurel Tree)" – 5:06 (I. Linders/T. Scherpenzeel)
 "Journey Through Time" – 3:24 (I. Linders/T. Scherpenzeel)
 "Phantom of the Night" – 5:02 (I. Linders/T. Scherpenzeel)

Side 2
 "Crime of Passion" – 3:30 (I. Linders/T. Scherpenzeel)
 "The Poet and the One Man Band" – 4:10 (T. Scherpenzeel)
 "Ruthless Queen" – 4:47 (I. Linders/T. Scherpenzeel)
 "No Man's Land" – 4:00 (T. Scherpenzeel)
 "First Signs of Spring" – 3:39 (T. Scherpenzeel)

Band members
Edward Reekers – lead vocals
Johan Slager – guitars
Ton Scherpenzeel – keyboards
Peter Scherpenzeel – bass guitar
Max Werner – drums, percussion, backing vocals
Katherine Lapthorn – backing vocals
Irene Linders – backing vocals

Charts

Weekly charts

Year-end charts

References

1978 albums
Kayak (band) albums